2 Good 2 Be True is a Philippine drama romantic comedy television series broadcast by Kapamilya Channel. It aired on the Kapamilya Channel's Primetime Bida evening block, A2Z, TV5, and worldwide via The Filipino Channel from May 16 to November 11, 2022, replacing Viral Scandal.

Series overview

Episodes

Season 1

Notes

References

Lists of Philippine drama television series episodes